The People's Assembly — Parliament of the Republic of Abkhazia is the unicameral legislature of the Republic of Abkhazia.

Composition

The People's Assembly has 35 members, elected for five-year terms in single-seat constituencies. On 30 July 2015, Parliament failed to support a constitutional amendment increasing the number of members to 45 and introducing a mixed electoral system. The proposal was supported by 19 Deputies, four short of the required two-thirds majority. (Five deputies voted against, 4 abstained.)

Leadership

Valery Kvarchia is the current speaker of parliament. He was elected on 12 April 2017, succeeding Valery Bganba. There are currently three Vice-Speakers: Said Kharazia, Levon Galustyan, and Mikhail Sangulia.

Committees

The People's Assembly currently contains the following eight committees:

Legal Policy, State Building and Human Rights
Budget, Credit Institutions, Tax and Finance
Economic Policy, Reform and Innovation
Defence and National Security
Social Policy, Labour and Health
Education, Science, Culture, Religion, Youth and Sport
International and Inter-Parliamentary Relations and Relations with Compatriots
Agrarian Policy, Natural Resources and Ecology

The number of committees had been eleven during the 4th convocation (from 2007 until 2012).

List of current Members

2017 parliamentary elections

References

 
Abkhazia
Abkhazia
Abkhazia